Louis Beguin-Billecocq (3 June 1865,  Paris – 1 April 1957, Nemours) was a French diplomat and entomologist who specialised in Coleoptera (beetles) and especially Curculionidae (the "true weevils").  He wrote Diagnoses d'espèces nouvelles d'Apionidae provenant de la région malgache d'Apionidae provenant de la région malgaque Annales de la Société Entomologique and Apions nouveaux de la République Argentine. Annales de la Société Entomologique de France. 78:449–464

1865 births
1957 deaths
French entomologists
French diplomats